The FIBT World Championships 2009, officially known as the Bauhaus FIBT Bobsleigh & Skeleton World Championships, February 20 to March 1, 2009, at the bobsleigh, luge, and skeleton track in Lake Placid, New York, for the ninth time, doing so previously in 1949, 1961, 1969, 1973, 1978, 1983, 1997 (skeleton), and 2003 (men's bobsleigh). Lake Placid was chosen 25–11 over Igls, Austria.

Event preparations 
Local schools were involved in a "Scholastic Sliding Challenge" (SSC) as part of the FIL World Luge Championships that was held in early February 2009. This program was developed at the 2007 World Luge Championships in Igls, then carried over to last year's World Luge Championships in Oberhof, Germany. 22 schools participated in the Lake Placid area that involved over 4000 students. The track was iced down on October 6, 2008, the earliest it has ever been iced in preparation for both the FIBT and FIL championships. Local media coverage was provided by WSLP-FM 93.3 in neighboring Saranac Lake. Online coverage in the United States was provided by Universal Sports.

World Cup champions prior to the championships
As of February 15, 2009, the top three final World Cup positions were as follows (note: in bobsleigh, only the driver is shown):

Bobsleigh

Two-man
February 21–22, 2009, at 08:30 EST (13:30 UTC) for the last two runs. The eventual silver medalists from Germany had the fastest first run, but the Swiss duo of Rüegg and Grand had the fastest times for the remaining three runs. Three-time and defending champion André Lange of Germany finished fifth.

Four-man
February 28 – March 1, 2009. The United States had the fastest time in each of the four runs to win their first bobsleigh gold medal at the World championships since 1959. This was Latvia's first ever medal at the championships while five-time and defending champion Lange of Germany would finish second.

Two-woman
February 20–21, 2009. The Canadian duo of Kaillie Humphries and Heather Moyse led after the first run while Rohbock/Meyers led after the second run before the British team of Minichiello/Cooke had the fastest third and fourth runs. Three-time defending champion Sandra Kiriasis of Germany finished seventh.

Skeleton

Men
February 27–28, 2009. The second run was cancelled after 20 skeleton racers had completed to irregular track conditions. Pengilly came from 15th after the first run to earn the silver medal. It was also Stähli's third gold medal which he earned on his 41st birthday.

Women
February 26–27, 2009. Trott set the track record in the first run and had the fastest time in all three runs. The final run was plagued with heavy rainfall and strong winds up to 50 mph (85 km/h). It was Williams' first world championship medal.

Mixed team
February 22, 2009. The mixed team eventconsisting of one run each of men's skeleton, women's skeleton, 2-man bobsleigh, and 2-women bobsleighdebuted at the 2007 championships. Germany had the fastest times in the first and third runs to win its third straight mixed team championship.

Medal table

References 

 United States Olympic Committee July 11, 2005 announcement of the FIBT awarding the FIBT World Championships 2009 to Lake Placid - Accessed November 6, 2007.

2009 in bobsleigh
IBSF World Championships
2009 in skeleton
International sports competitions hosted by the United States
Sports in Lake Placid, New York
2009 in American sports
Bobsleigh in the United States